The Capas National Shrine in Barangay Aranguren, Capas, Tarlac, Philippines was built by the Philippine government as a memorial to Allied soldiers who died at Camp O'Donnell at the end of the Bataan Death March during the Second World War.

The site, which was the former concentration camp for the Allied prisoners, is a focus for commemorations on Araw ng Kagitingan (Valour Day), an annual observance held on 9 April—the anniversary of the surrender of US and Philippine forces to Imperial Japan in 1942. There is also a memorial inside the site to the Czechs who died fighting alongside the Filipino and US soldiers.

Description

The area where the Bataan Death March ended was proclaimed as "Capas National Shrine" by President Corazon Aquino on 7 December 1991. The shrine encompasses  of parkland,  of which have been planted with trees each representing the dead, at the location of the former concentration camp.  Prior to the construction, the location was under the control of the United States Navy as U.S. Naval Radio Station, Tarlac until 1989.

On 9 April 2003, a  obelisk symbolizing peace surrounded by a new memorial wall were unveiled on a part of the grounds of the former internment camp. The obelisk is surrounded by a three-segmented, black marble wall engraved with the names of more than 30,000 Filipinos who were incarcerated in the camp. There are also statistics about the total number of prisoners and dead, accompanied by poems for peace.

Nearby, on the western side of the shrine, there are three smaller memorials to the countries whose nationals died at the camp: the Philippines, the United States, and the Czech Republic (then Czechoslovakia). A small museum and monument is also on the site, built by an American group called the "Battling Bastards of Bataan". Included here is a roster of Filipino officers who were appointed by the Camp Commandant to manage the POWs.  It also memorializes the daily sufferings of the POWs under the hands of the Imperial Japanese Army camp wards.  Records have indicated that around 400 Filipino POWs died daily until August 1942.

A few hundred meters from the Obelisk is a garden separated from the rest of the shrine by a creek that can be crossed via a hanging bridge. The relics of an old livestock wagon or boxcar of the Philippine National Railway and railings are also found in the shrine complex. This display would be similar to the SNCF wagon displayed at the Auschwitz concentration camp, giving visitors an idea of the difficulties faced by the POWs who were herded in 80 persons per wagon volume, during hot summer conditions, without food, water, or facilities for sanitation.

According to the Philippine government's master plan, the Shrine will be a part of the New Clark City.

Gallery

References

External links

 Capas page of the Pacific Wreck database, which has information relating to the Capas National Shrine (with pictures).
 Battling Bastards of Bataan

Military history of the Philippines
World War II memorials in the Philippines
Buildings and structures in Tarlac
World War II sites in the Philippines
Tourist attractions in Tarlac
Monuments and memorials in the Philippines
Military and war museums in the Philippines
National Shrines of the Philippines